The People's Party of Korea was a moderate left-wing political party created on November 12, 1945 by Lyuh Woon-Hyung. The People's Party did not claim to exclusively represent a particular class; instead, it tried to represent the entire Korean people. As the Soviet-US Committee failed in 1946, a faction within the People's Party called forty-eighters left the party and formed the Workers Party of South Korea (남조선로동당), in a coalition with Communist Party of South Korea (조선공산당) and New People's Party (신민당). The People's Party dissolved soon thereafter, and Lyuh later formed the Socialist Labourer's Party (사회로동당).

History

Background

Activities	
They propelled the  "Left-Right Coalition Movement in Korean peninsula" (좌우합작운동)

Dissolution

References

Defunct political parties in Korea
Socialist parties in Korea
Political parties established in 1945